Protamblyopone can refer to:
Protamblyopone Wheeler, 1927, junior synonym of Amblyopone
Protamblyopone Dlussky, 1981, homonym replaced by Casaleia